The 1961 All-Ireland Junior Hurling Championship was the 40th staging of the All-Ireland Junior Championship since its establishment by the Gaelic Athletic Association in 1912.

London entered the championship as the defending champions.

The All-Ireland final was played on 1 October 1961 at Austin Stack Park in Tralee, between Kerry and London, in what was their first meeting in the final. Kerry won the match by 4-14 to 2-05 to claim their first championship title.

Results

All-Ireland Junior Hurling Championship

All-Ireland semi-finals

All-Ireland home final

All-Ireland final

References

Junior
All-Ireland Junior Hurling Championship